Webtoon Hero Toondra Show is a 2015 South Korean television series starring Park Jung-hwa, Son Jin-young and Kim Kyung-shik. The first season aired on cable channel MBC Every 1 from July 27 to October 19, 2015; the second season aired on the same channel from January 28 to April 14, 2016.

Season 1 Cast

The Texts of the Joseon Dynasty
 Lee Du-il  — King Sejong
 Kim Kyeong-sik — Kim Nae-gwan 
 Park So-eun - Crown Princess Consort Hwi, Crown Prince Yi Hyang’s wife 
 Son Jin-young - Grand Prince Suyang
 Mujeokpink — Sagwan
 Lee Si-eon - Yi Bang-won
 Lee Hyeon-ji - Queen Inhyeon
 Kwon Do-gyun - King Heonjong
 Hwang Seok-jeong - Queen Sunwon
 Yu Byeong-jae - King Cheoljong
 Heo Han-na - Bong-yi 
 Lee Hyo-eun - Royal Noble Consort Gyeong of the Gwangsan Kim clan, concubine of King Heonjong

Innocent Family
 Jung Il-hoon - Kim Seong-min
 Lee Hyung-suk - Kim Kwang-min
 Kim Jeong-suk - Dad
 Kian84 - Kim Hui-min
 Shin Ji-soo - Shin Ha-na
 Kim Gwang-seob - Gwang Seob  
 Choi Jung-hoon - Pizza owner
 Kim Ji-suk - Ji-suk
 Kisum - Kisum

My Man is a Childcare Assistant
 Park Jeong-hwa as Yook Ah-young
 Park Eun-seok as Joo Do-jin
 Lee Cheol-woo as Baek Shin
 Seo Han-gyeol as Chae Kang-woo
 Go Hyun as Go Yong-je

Season 2 Cast

The Texts of the Joseon Dynasty 
 Hwang Seok-jeong - 45 year old Hwang Deok-jeong 
 Park Jin-joo - 15 year old Hwang Deok-jeong 
 Lee Sung-ok - 17 year old Choi Ok 
 Kwon Hyeok-su - 17 year old Lee Mung-ryong 
 Shin Ju-han - 17 year old Shin Ju-han
 Son Jin-young - 45 year old Shin Ju-han 
 Jo Yoon-ho - Joseon end que
 Jin Chin - New face 
 Chae Jong-hyeop as King Sejong

The Flower Family 
 Kim Won-jun - poisonous camellia
 Jeong Si-ah - Cinnamon 
 Jang Do-yoon - Single Peony
 Kim Bo-ra - poison pampas grass
 Jeong Ji-sun - Na Chu-nam 
 Min Ji-yeong - In Jo-hui 
 Kim Hae-ju - Na Mi-hui 
 Choi Woong - Hwang Jun 
 Cha Yeong-nam - Gwak Guk-gwang
 Hyeon Seung-min - Park Bok-nam
 Hwang Mi-yeong - Double Dragon Ye-rim
 Kim Ah-yeong - Double dragon Ga-eun

References

External links
 

MBC TV television dramas
2015 South Korean television series debuts
Korean-language television shows
Television shows based on South Korean webtoons
Television series by Studio Santa Claus Entertainment